The 7th (extraordinary) Congress of the RSDLP(b) (Russian Social Democratic Labor Party), also known as the  Extraordinary 7th  Congress of the RCP(b) (Russian Communist Party (Bolsheviks)), was held between 6–8 March 1918. During this congress the Bolsheviks changed the name of the party to include the word "Communist".

It was the first congress of the Bolsheviks after their gaining of power in the October Revolution. It was held in the Taurida Palace in Petrograd (St. Petersburg) in extraordinary session to consider the peace treaty with Germany to end World War I, concluded by the Treaty of Brest-Litovsk earlier in March.

The 47 plenipotentiary and 59 consultative delegates represented about 17,000 Party members. The actual Party head count was about 300,000, but many delegates could not arrive on such short notice, partially because of the German occupation of significant territory.

The agenda was:
Report of the 6th Central Committee (delivered by Vladimir Lenin)
War and peace
Revision of the Party Programme, including the change of the name of the Party
Miscellanea
Elections of the 7th Central Committee

Brest Peace
The Brest Peace was an issue of fierce controversy within the Party. The Brest Peace was opposed by the faction of the Left Communists, who were led by Nickolay Bukharin and were influential in the major party organizations: in Moscow, Petrograd, and the Urals . There was little unity among the supporters of the Brest Peace.
After Lenin's report, Bukharin presented a second report, demanding that the war with Germany continue.

After heated discussions, Lenin's version of the Resolution On War And Peace  was approved at the morning session of March 8 by a signed vote: 30 in favor, 12 against, 4 abstained. Lenin's proposal, was not made public at that time and was first published in the January 1, 1919 Kommunar, a daily newspaper issued by the Central Committee for workers in Moscow.

The Brest Peace was ratified by the Extraordinary Fourth All-Russia Congress of Soviets (March 14–16).

List of elected members to the Central Committee

The Contress elected the following members to the Central Committee (by number of received votes): 

Elected Members
Lenin (Ulyanov) Vladimir Ilyich
Trotsky Lev Davidovich
Sverdlov Yakov Mikhailovich
Zinoviev Grigorii Evseevich
Bukharin Nikolai Ivanovich
Stalin Iosif Vissarionovich
Sokolnikov Grigori Iakovlevich
Krestinsky Nikolai Nikolaevich
Smilga Ivar Tenisovich
Stasova Elena Dmitrievna
Lashevich Mikhail Mikhailovich
Shmidt Vasilii Vladimirovich
Dzerzhinsky Feliks Edmundovich
Vladimirsky Mikhail Fedorovich
Artem (Sergeev Fedor Andreevich)

Candidates 
Ioffe Adolf Abramovich
Kiselev Aleksei Semenovich
Berzin Ian Antonovich
Uritsky Moisei Solomonovich
Stuchka Petr Ivanovich
Petrovsky Grigory Ivanovich
Lomov (Oppokov) Georgy Ippolitovich
Shliapnikov Aleksandr Gavrilovich

External links
 Speeches by Lenin at the Extraordinary Seventh Congress of the R.C.P.(B.), Collected Works, Progress Publishers, Moscow, Volume 27, 1972, pages 85–158

References
"Seventh Congress of the Russian Communist Party. Verbatim Report. March 6–8, 1918" (1923)

Communist Party of the Soviet Union 07
1918 in Russia
1918 conferences
March 1918 events